KSGN ("Keep Sharing Good News") is a non-commercial based radio station located in Redlands, California, broadcasting to the Riverside, San Bernardino, Palm Springs, Banning areas of the Inland Empire on 89.7 FM and airs a Christian Contemporary music format. It was first launched in 1958 as KNFP which was formed by three professors at La Sierra College (now La Sierra University) in Riverside. The station has changed its call letters over the years. Other call letters included KSDA, KLLU and finally KSGN. The station's business office and studios were located on the campus of La Sierra University from 1958 to 2005.  In mid 2005 KSGN relocated its business office and studios to a location in Redlands just north of Interstate 10.

Programming
In addition to the Christian Contemporary music, KSGN programming includes the following personalities and shows:

The Brant Hansen Show - M-F 6A-9A, M-F 1P-3P, Sun 12P-4P
Theresa Ross - M-F 9A-1P
Scott & Sam - M-F 3P-7P, Sat 12P-4P
Keep The Faith w/ Penny - M-Sat 7P-12A
The Amanda Carroll Show - Sat 8A-12P, Sun 8A-12P
Sarah Taylor - Sat-Sun 4P-7P

Translators
In addition to the main station, KSGN is relayed by an additional two translators to widen its broadcast area.

External links
Official Website

Contemporary Christian radio stations in the United States
Mass media in San Bernardino, California
Mass media in Riverside, California
Radio stations established in 1970
1970 establishments in California
SGN